State Route 204 (SR 204) is part of Maine's system of numbered state highways, located in Hancock County. It runs from SR 3 in Trenton, passing SR 184 in Lamoine, and ending at the intersection with Seal Point and Marlboro Beach roads.

Route description
SR 204 begins at SR 3 in Trenton. It heads northeast, crossing into Lamoine. Then the route has a  concurrency with SR 184 in Lamoine. After the concurrency, SR 204 is heading southeast towards Seal Point Road and Marlboro Beach Road, where the SR 204 designation ends.

Junction list

References

External links

Floodgap Roadgap's RoadsAroundME: Maine State Route 204

204
Transportation in Hancock County, Maine